Michael von Newlinsky (21 June 1891 – 14 August 1964) was an Austrian film actor who appeared in numerous supporting roles during his career, in films such as Georg Wilhelm Pabst's Pandora's Box (1929).

Selected filmography

 Under Suspicion (1928)
 The Republic of Flappers (1928)
 My Heart is a Jazz Band (1929)
 Inherited Passions (1929)
 The League of Three (1929)
 The Wonderful Lies of Nina Petrovna (1929)
 Ludwig II, King of Bavaria (1929)
 Katharina Knie (1929)
 Pandora's Box (1929)
 Morals at Midnight (1930)
 Two Worlds (1930)
 The Son of the White Mountain (1930)
 Mountains on Fire (1931)
 The Street Song (1931)
 The Case of Colonel Redl (1931)
 The Little Escapade (1931)
 Her Grace Commands (1931)
 Elisabeth of Austria (1931)
 Children of Fortune (1931)
 The Magic Top Hat (1932)
 A Tremendously Rich Man (1932)
 The Invisible Front (1932)
 Marschall Vorwärts (1932)
 Today Is the Day (1933)
 The Testament of Dr. Mabuse (1933)
 The Sporck Battalion (1934)
 A Woman Who Knows What She Wants (1934)
 The Double (1934)
 I Was Jack Mortimer (1935)
 The Red Rider (1935)
 Der Kaiser von Kalifornien (1936)
 Stronger Than Regulations (1936)
 Under Blazing Heavens (1936)
 Ride to Freedom (1937)
 Gordian the Tyrant (1937)
 Togger (1937)
 Carousel (1937)
 Dangerous Game (1937)
 A Prussian Love Story (1938)
 Faded Melody (1938)
 Red Orchids (1938)
 Men, Animals and Sensations (1938)
 Target in the Clouds (1939)
 Capriccio (1938)
 Kitty and the World Conference (1939)
 Hurrah! I'm a Father (1939)
 Kora Terry (1940)
 Counterfeiters (1940)
 Friedemann Bach (1941)
 Beloved World (1942)
 Tonelli (1943)
 A Man With Principles? (1943)
 The Years Pass (1945)
 Dark Eyes (1951)
 Geheimakten Solvay (1953)

References

Bibliography
 Roberts, Ian. German Expressionist Cinema: The World of Light and Shadow. Wallflower Press, 2008.

External links

1891 births
1964 deaths
Austrian male stage actors
Austrian male film actors
Austrian male silent film actors
Male actors from Vienna
20th-century Austrian male actors